Eaindra Kyaw Zin (born 24 April 1977) is a two-time Myanmar Academy Award-winning Burmese actress and model. She is Myanmar's third highest-paid actress and an amateur painter. Now, being above 40, she still remains a popular actress in Myanmar.

Early life
Eaindra Kyaw Zin was born to a well-to-do family in Yangon, the youngest child of Mya Thida and Kyaw Zin. She is a granddaughter of Bo Zeya, one of the Thirty Comrades that founded the modern Burmese Army, a niece of Dagon Taya, a writer, and a first cousin of singer Hayma Ne Win and singer and film star Yaza Ne Win. Kyaw Zin graduated from Yangon's Dagon 1 High School. She holds a B.Sc. degree in chemistry.

Career
In an interview with The Myanmar Times, Kyaw Zin admitted that film was not her initial choice of a career. Rather she envisioned herself as an independent artist or a doctor but had to reevaluate her options after getting sub-par grades in school. Her first foray into the entertainment industry came by way of a local beauty contest. She won the Miss Kokkine contest in 1996, and then went on to win Miss Christmas that same year. After this year, she became to act in TV series such as Loving Editor (Chit Thaw Editor) and Ah Hnine Mae. She became popular in Ah Hnine Mae TV series with a character called Po Tay. For the next two years she appeared in magazines and modeling shows. In 2000, she scored her big break as an actress in the film Pyaw Lai Kya Ya Aung (Let's Have Great Fun) as the lead actress. She was nominated as best lead actress at Tha-Mee-Shin Film for 2000 Academy.

Ironically, her film career in the early 2000s was handicapped by the top leading man of that day, Yaza Ne Win, her first cousin. In 2003, she spoke to Chiangmai-based The Irrawaddy magazine that "I have limited opportunities to act in current popular movies. In the movies, I can only perform sibling roles with my first cousin and we can not shoot love scenes." As it is leading men who score big at the box office in Burma, and being cast aside male superstars is an actress's best chance at fame.

Eaindra Kyaw Zin won the 2004 Myanmar Academy Award, playing a villain role in the movie, Flirtatious Sky. She continues to act in films and model for commercials. Eaindra Kyaw Zin also won the 2017 Myanmar Academy Award, playing in the main role in the movie, Knife in the Heart ( Yin-Bat-Htae-Ka-Dar). Although she is over 40, she is still a top model and actress in an industry full of young starlets. She is also vice-CEO of Pyay Ti Oo Education Foundation and, Chair-Person of Thudra Film Production and The Bridge Myanmar.

Political views and activities
In December 2003, the Burmese actress was accused by The Irrawaddy for displaying " conspicuous patriotism". When the Thai film Bang Rajan—which featured scenes of one of Burma's 18th century invasions of the Thai kingdom—was screened at a Pan-Asian film festival in France in early 2001, Kyaw Zin stormed out of the theater before the film's end. Its director, Thanit Jitnukul, who took home the festival's Best Director award, recounted meeting Kyaw Zin that day. "She was very friendly at first," Thanit said. "Then she asked me about my movie. I told her its name, and she refused to talk to me again."

Following the 2021 Myanmar coup d'état, she participated in the anti-coup movement both in person at rallies and through social media. Denouncing the military coup, she took part in protests, starting in February. She joined the "We Want Justice" three-finger salute movement. The movement was launched on social media, and many celebrities have joined the movement.

On 2 April 2021, warrants for her arrest were issued under Section 505 (a) of the Myanmar Penal Code by the State Administration Council for speaking out against the military coup. Along with several other celebrities, she was charged with calling for participation in the Civil Disobedience Movement (CDM) and damaging the state's ability to govern, with supporting the Committee Representing Pyidaungsu Hluttaw, and with generally inciting the people to disturb the peace and stability of the nation.

On 9 April 2021, Eaindra Kyaw Zin and her husband Pyay Ti Oo, were arrested at their home. After almost 11 months, they were released on March 2, 2022.

Personal life
She married actor Pyay Ti Oo on 1 January 2011. They have two children.

Social work
Eaindra Kyaw Zin is socially involved with the community and various Burmese charities and is considered by her peers to be a good role model for young women in the country.

Filmography

Awards and nominations

Beauty pageants

Myanmar Academy Awards

Other awards

References

External links
 
 Eindra Kyaw Zin on Facebook

Living people
Burmese film actresses
1977 births
21st-century Burmese actresses
People from Yangon
Burmese female models
Prisoners and detainees of Myanmar